Tomáš Jiránek (born July 8, 1991) is a Czech professional ice hockey player. He played with BK Mladá Boleslav in the Czech Extraliga during the 2010–11 Czech Extraliga playoffs.

References

External links

1991 births
Living people
BK Mladá Boleslav players
Czech ice hockey forwards
Ice hockey people from Prague
LHK Jestřábi Prostějov players
HC Dukla Jihlava players
HC Slavia Praha players
AZ Havířov players
Orli Znojmo players